Shunem or Shunaam ( shūlēm; in LXX ) was a small village mentioned in the Bible in the possession of the Tribe of Issachar. It was located near the Jezreel Valley, north of Mount Gilboa.  

Shunaam is where the Philistines camped when they fought Saul, the first king of Israel. It was the hometown of Abishag, King David's companion in his old age. The prophet Elisha was hospitably entertained there by a wealthy woman whose deceased son Elisha brought back to life. (2 Kings 4:8)

Shunaam is listed as a town conquered by the pharaohs of Egypt Thutmose III and Shoshenk I.

Shunaam may have been located at the site of the modern village of Sulam.

See also
 Shunamitism

References

Hebrew Bible places